Marie Antoinette Riana Graharani (born 13 July 1992), commonly known as The Sacred Riana, is an Indonesian magician and illusionist best known for her performance as a bizarre illusionist.

Career

Competitive shows 
She made her television debut as a contestant on Deddy Corbuzier's magic competition show The Next Mentalist, which premiered on 17 November 2013 and was broadcast on Trans 7. She would go on to become the show's runner-up, successfully attracting the attention of the Indonesian public with her unique appearance.

In 2017, Riana joined the second season of Asia's Got Talent where she was declared the winner after beating the Filipino hip-hop dance group DM-X Comvaleñoz based on the audience votes in the grand final. There have been over 70 million views on Facebook and YouTube of her magic performances onstage.

In 2018, Riana appeared on season 13 of America's Got Talent where she was finished as a quarterfinalist. She was also the second Indonesian to enter America's Got Talent live shows after Demian Aditya. On 31 August 2019, Riana took to the Britain's Got Talent: The Champions stage but was eliminated in the first round.

On 21 August 2018, during the America's Got Talent quarterfinals live show, Riana's act was abruptly cut to black and a commercial break before the end of her performance, which confused many viewers about what had just happened and quickly provoked a huge question on social media, but according to a set of production notes which have been posted on Twitter, the dramatic "cut-to-black" moment was actually part of the plan all along. 
 
In autumn 2022, Riana appeared in La France a un incroyable talent and reached the Semi-Finals. She was also announced to be one of the participants of America's Got Talent: All-Stars.

Television and film
Riana has appeared on several television shows or joined several talent search shows as a guest or contestant and later became a judge in The Great Magician show. In 2019, Riana made her film debut by playing as herself in The Sacred Riana: Beginning, which was released on 14 March 2019.

Character and artistry

Background 
Riana and her manager chose "The Sacred" name because they think that doing magic is a sacred thing for some people.

Characteristics on stage

Riana has a distinctive appearance, characterized by head and hand twitching movement, always stands with one of her legs bent and a flat facial expression. Riana always appears with long and loose hair that covers most of her face.

In each stage appearance, Riana wears a long-sleeved dress and white tights and also holds her doll, Riani, which wears the same style of clothing as the magician. When she speaks during performances, she does so in a quavering and unclear voice.

Performances and appearances

Awards and nominations

References

External links
 

1992 births
America's Got Talent contestants
Living people
Indonesian magicians
Indonesian people of Chinese descent
People from Jakarta
Female magicians